A by-election for the constituency of Bilston in the United Kingdom House of Commons was held on 20 September 1944, caused by the death of the incumbent Conservative MP Ian Hannah. The result was a hold for the Conservative Party, with their candidate William Ernest Gibbons, with a majority of just 349 votes over an Independent Labour Party candidate.

Election history

Result

References

 Craig, F. W. S. (1983) [1969]. British parliamentary election results 1918-1949 (3rd edition ed.). Chichester: Parliamentary Research Services. . 
 

By-elections to the Parliament of the United Kingdom in West Midlands (county) constituencies
1944 in England
1944 elections in the United Kingdom
Elections in Wolverhampton
By-elections to the Parliament of the United Kingdom in Staffordshire constituencies
20th century in Staffordshire